The Samurai Kill is the 215th novel in the long-running Nick Carter-Killmaster series. It was first published in 1986.

Plot summary
A biological weapon of unknown species attacks scuba divers in the Pacific Ocean, killing them with its sting before disappearing. It manifests as green vegetation. Nobody knows where it came from, or its motive. It sabotages top secret U.S. installations operating a "Star Wars"-type project, and destroys a Soviet spy ship. The lifeform inflames the tension between the United States and Russia. Nick Carter is fast on the tracks of the mysterious force, but a plot has already been triggered.

Main characters
Nick Carter (agent N-3, AXE)
Hawk (Carter's boss, head of AXE)
Siobhan O'Neill (Australian intelligence officer)
General Scott (Commander of a U.S. military base)

Nick Carter-Killmaster novels
1986 novels